The DeRidder-Fort Polk South, LA combined statistical area is made up of two parishes in central Louisiana. The statistical area consists of the Fort Polk South Micropolitan Statistical Area and the DeRidder Micropolitan Statistical Area. As of the 2000 census, the CSA had a population of 85,517 (though a July 1, 2009 estimate placed the population at 120,035).

Parishes
Beauregard
Vernon

Communities
Places with more than 10,000 inhabitants
DeRidder
Fort Polk South (Principal city and census-designated place)
Places with 5,000 to 10,000 inhabitants
New Llano (Principal city)
Leesville
Places with 1,000 to 5,000 inhabitants
Fort Polk North (census-designated place)
Merryville
New Llano
Rosepine
Places with less than 1,000 inhabitants
Anacoco
Hornbeck
Simpson

Demographics
As of the census of 2000, there were 85,517 people, 30,364 households, and 22,791 families residing within the CSA. The racial makeup of the CSA was 77.77% White, 15.46% African American, 1.15% Native American, 1.20% Asian, 0.21% Pacific Islander, 1.65% from other races, and 2.56% from two or more races. Hispanic or Latino of any race were 4.19% of the population.

The median income for a household in the CSA was $31,899, and the median income for a family was $36,283. Males had a median income of $30,860 versus $20,028 for females. The per capita income for the CSA was $14,775.

See also
Louisiana census statistical areas
List of cities, towns, and villages in Louisiana
List of census-designated places in Louisiana

References

Geography of Vernon Parish, Louisiana
Geography of Beauregard Parish, Louisiana
Combined statistical areas of the United States